Tiba is a wind instrument made of wood or metal that originates in the Grisons canton in Switzerland. It was used by shepherds on alpine meadows in the Alps.

Exhibition 
The Regional Museum of Surselva held until the end of March 2011 the exhibition "Tiba Tones", showing the 50+ Tibas made of different materials. Numerous people from the region showed their tibas, which were stored in alpine huts, at the museum's request.

References

External links
  Kurze Radiosendung in Schweizerdeutsch über die Tiba - Radio SRF Musikwelle "Die Vuvuzela der Alpen"

Swiss musical instruments
Natural horns and trumpets